Rimlan may refer to:
 Rimlan-e Kamal
 Rimlan-e Pain
 Rimlan-e Vosta